The 2020–21 West Virginia Mountaineers men's basketball team represented West Virginia University during the 2020–21 NCAA Division I men's basketball season. The Mountaineers were coached by Bob Huggins, in his 14th season as WVU's head coach, and played their home games at the WVU Coliseum in Morgantown, West Virginia as members of the Big 12 Conference. They finished the season 19–10, 11–6 in Big 12 Play to finish in 4th place. They lost in the quarterfinals of the Big 12 tournament to Oklahoma State. They received an at-large bid to the NCAA tournament where they defeated Morehead State in the First Round before losing in the Second Round to Syracuse.

Previous season
The Mountaineers finished 2019–20 season 21–10, 9–9 in Big 12 play to finish tied for third place in the conference. The Mountaineers were to play in the Big 12 Tournament, but it was canceled due to the COVID-19 Pandemic.

Offseason

Departures

Recruits

Recruiting class of 2020

Incoming transfers

Roster

Schedule 

|-
!colspan=12 style=| Regular season
|-

|-
!colspan=12 style=| Big 12 Tournament

|-
!colspan=9 style=| NCAA tournament

Rankings

*AP does not release post-NCAA Tournament rankings.^Coaches did not release a Week 1 poll.

References

West Virginia Mountaineers men's basketball seasons
West Virginia
West Virginia
West Virginia
West Virginia